MacMillan's shrew (Crocidura macmillani) is a species of mammal in the family Soricidae. It is endemic to the Ethiopian Highlands. Its natural habitats are subtropical or tropical moist montane forests, and moist savanna.

Sources
 Lavrenchenko, L. 2004.  Crocidura macmillani.   2006 IUCN Red List of Threatened Species.   Downloaded on 30 July 2007.

MacMillan's shrew
Endemic fauna of Ethiopia
Mammals of Ethiopia
Fauna of the Ethiopian Highlands
Vulnerable animals
Vulnerable biota of Africa
MacMillan's shrew
Taxonomy articles created by Polbot